Squalamine is a steroid-polyamine conjugate compound with broad spectrum antimicrobial activity and anti-angiogenic activity. It was studied as a potential cancer drug and as a potential treatment for wet macular degeneration but as of 2018 had not succeeded in Phase III trials for any use.

Pharmacology 
Squalamine disrupts microbial membranes; the exact mechanism is not known.

Squalamine appears to have an anti-angiogenic effect in mammalian cells by binding to calmodulin once it is taken up by the cell; this prevents signal transduction downstream of pro-angiogenic factors like VEGF.

Chemistry
Squalamine is a steroid-polyamine conjugate.

It was first isolated from the liver of sharks of the genus Squalus but methods to make it synthetically have been subsequently developed.

Research
Squalamine was studied as a potential drug to treat several forms of cancer and wet macular degeneration by scientists at Magainin Pharmaceuticals (subsequently called Genaera), but the company ran out of money and closed in 2009.   Squalamine and some other drug assets were sold to Ohr Pharmaceutical for $200,000 by Genaera's liquidator.

It was studied in an eye drop formulation as a potential way to treat wet macular degeneration in combination with ranibizumab by Ohr Pharmaceuticals. A Phase II trial failed in 2015, but Ohr said a subpopulation with choroidal neovascularization responded well enough to justify a Phase III trial.  Ohr announced that the Phase III trial had failed in January 2018.

References 

Angiogenesis inhibitors
Cholestanes
Polyamines
Antiviral drugs
Secondary alcohols
Secondary amines
Sulfate esters